McDavid is an unincorporated community in Escambia County, Florida, United States. The community is part of the Pensacola – Ferry Pass – Brent, Florida Metropolitan Statistical Area.  The ZIP Code for McDavid is 32568.

History
The community was named after Joel McDavid, a founding resident of the community.  Before the community was renamed in 1883, it was known as Regia.

Geography
The town lies directly south of Century, Florida and north of Molino, Florida. The main roads within the town are U.S. Route 29 and County Road 164.

The town has a post office that serves the north end of the county.

Education
The town's children attend schools within the Escambia County School District including Bratt Elementary School, Byrneville Elementary School, Ernest Ward Middle School, and Northview High School.

References

 https://archive.today/20130119073148/http://citystatedata.com/McDavid-Florida.html
 https://web.archive.org/web/20120826165116/http://usps.whitepages.com/service/post_office/mc-david-7-main-st-mc-david-fl-1372416

Unincorporated communities in Escambia County, Florida
Unincorporated communities in Florida